Trinity Monastery may refer to:

 Trinity Monastery (Chernihiv), Chernihiv, Ukraine
 Trinity Monastery of St. Jonas, Kiev, Ukraine

See also 

 Holy Trinity monastery (disambiguation)